Thedwastre was a rural district in West Suffolk, England from 1894 to 1974.  Thedwastre was formed under the Local Government Act 1894, from the part of the Stow Rural Sanitary District which was in West Suffolk (the rest forming East Stow Rural District in East Suffolk).  It was named after the historic hundred of Thedwastre.

The district was abolished in 1974, under the Local Government Act 1972, and went to form part of the Mid Suffolk district in Suffolk. Its boundaries never changed during its 80 years existence.

Parishes
The rural district comprised the following civil parishes:
 Badwell Ash
Beyton
 Drinkstone
Elmswell
 Felsham
 Gedding
 Great Ashfield
 Hessett
 Hinderclay
 Hunston
Langham
Norton
 Rattlesden
 Rickinghall Inferior
 Stowlangtoft
 Thurston
 Tostock
Walsham le Willows
 Wattisfield
Woolpit

Statistics

Premises
The council held its first meeting on 10 January 1895 at the Stow Union Workhouse in the parish of Onehouse, just outside Stowmarket. Hervey Aston Oakes was appointed the council's first chairman, and it was decided that subsequent meetings would be held at the courthouse in Stowmarket.

The council remained based in Stowmarket (and therefore outside its administrative area) until 1959, when it moved to purpose-built premises on Cooks Road in Elmswell. The council remained based at Elmswell until its abolition in 1974. The council's former offices were subsequently converted into retirement housing and renamed Manns Court.

References

History of Suffolk
Districts of England abolished by the Local Government Act 1972
Districts of England created by the Local Government Act 1894
Rural districts of England